Pere Joan Tomas Sogero is an Andorran, businessman and diplomat and is the current Andorran ambassador to the Russian Federation, presenting his credentials to Russian President Vladimir Putin on 13 April 2007.

He took the position of Honorary consul of the Russian Federation in the Principality of Andorra in 2010.

References

Ambassadors of Andorra to Russia
Andorran diplomats
Living people
Year of birth missing (living people)